G. Bond is a small lunar impact crater to the south of the Lacus Somniorum, a small lunar mare in the northeast part of the Moon's near side. It was named after the American astronomer George Phillips Bond. It lies to the east of the larger crater Posidonius, and to the south of the flooded crater remnant Hall. The crater is situated in a rugged section of terrain to the northwest of the Montes Taurus mountain region.

This is a roughly circular crater that has not suffered significant impact. It is a bowl-shaped formation with an interior floor that is about half the diameter of the crater. The inner walls just slope down from the rim, and lack any notable structure.

To the west of G. Bond is a prominent rille in the lava-flooded surface, designated the Rima G. Bond. This cleft follows a course roughly along a north–south orientation, and continues for a length of about 150 kilometers. The center of this feature is at 33.3° N, 35.5° E.

Satellite craters
By convention these features are identified on lunar maps by placing the letter on the side of the crater midpoint that is closest to G. Bond.

See also 
 Asteroid 767 Bondia
 W. Bond (crater) on the Moon
 Bond (crater) on Mars

References

Sources

 
 
 
 
 
 
 
 
 
 
 

Impact craters on the Moon